DF-1 / DF1 protocol is an asynchronous byte-oriented protocol that is used to communicate with most Allen Bradley RS-232 interface modules. DF1 protocol consists of link layer and application layer formats. DF1 works over half duplex and full duplex modes of communication.

Application layer messages
Application layer message format consists of Command Initiator messages (request messages) and Command Executor (reply messages). Important command initiator messages are as follows.

 apply port configuration
 bit write
 change mode
 close file
 diagnostic status
 disable forces
 disable outputs
 download request
 echo
 enable  outputs
 enable PLC scanning
 enter download mode
 enter upload mode
 exit download/upload mode
 file read
 file write
 get edit resource
 initialize memory
 modify PLC-2 compatibility file
 open file
 physical read
 physical write
 read bytes physical
 read diagnostic counters
 reset diagnostic counters
 read link parameters
 read-modify-write
 read section size
 restart request
 set CPU mode
 set data table size
 set ENQs
 set link parameters
 set NAKs
 set timeout
 set variables
 shutdown

See also

Computer networking
Computer science

External links
 DF1 Protocol Reference Manual
 DF1 protocol Open Source

Industrial computing
Serial buses
Industrial automation